Caltoris kumara, the blank swift, is a butterfly belonging to the family Hesperiidae.

Description

It is found in the India and Sri Lanka.
In India, a range extension of this species to the western Himalaya was recorded in 2018.

References

Caltoris
Butterflies of Asia
Butterflies of Indochina